Otterden is a civil parish and village on the Kent Downs in the borough of Maidstone in Kent, England.

History
Otterden is mentioned in the Domesday Book under Kent in the lands belonging to Adam FitzHubert. The book which was written in 1086 said:

Otterden has an important place in the history of science: Stephen Gray and Granville Wheler carried out their seminal experiments showing that electricity can be conducted over long distances at Wheler's estate there in 1729.

From 1933 to 1940 and from 1946 to 1948, Otterden was the home of the Bunce Court School, founded by Anna Essinger when she closed her German boarding school after the Nazi Party seized power and moved her school to England.

References

External links

Villages in Kent
Civil parishes in Kent